Qaleh-ye Dezh Kuh (also Romanized as Qal‘eh-ye Dezh Kūh; also known as Dezh Kūh, Dozd Kūh, Qal‘eh Duzdkūd, Qal‘eh-ye Dozd Kūh, and Qal‘eh-ye Dozheh Kūh) is a village in Tayebi-ye Garmsiri-ye Jonubi Rural District, in the Central District of Kohgiluyeh County, Kohgiluyeh and Boyer-Ahmad Province, Iran. At the 2006 census, its population was 65, in 18 families.

References 

Populated places in Kohgiluyeh County